Flawless is a 1999 American crime comedy-drama film written and directed by Joel Schumacher and starring Robert De Niro and Philip Seymour Hoffman.

Plot
Decorated and retired security guard Walter Koontz lives in a downtown apartment complex, where he is in constant conflict with drag queen Rusty and his friends. He frequents a night club, from which he conducts a superficial sexual relationship with Karen. At the same time he rejects Tia, deeming her a 'whore'.

One night crime boss "Mr. Z" and two goons come to the building looking for the money Amber's boyfriend stole from his organization. Having heard gunshots upstairs, Walt suffers a stroke while ascending the stairs to help. He awakens with the right side of his body paralyzed resulting in poor speech and posture, and giving him a limp that requires him to use a cane. Walter's ego massively suffers and he becomes ashamed to be seen in public, even skipping therapy, leading to his doctor visiting him at home. His physical therapist, who had been sent to Walt's home by the doctor, recommends a singing teacher to improve his speech. When Walt hails a taxi outside the building, he falls and drops the plan.

Rusty desires to have sex reassignment surgery, but lacks the money. When Walter comes to Rusty to use his musical talents for singing lessons, the pair, while initially argumentative and uncomfortable with each other, slowly become friends. Walter begins to gain confidence and progress towards resuming a normal life, his speech showing considerable improvement. Meanwhile, after having been told by Rusty that everyone pays in a relationship, including husbands and boyfriends, Walt calls Karen. After she claims rent problems Walt lies that all his money went to therapy, after which she holds off on seeing him. Tia visits his apartment, and they dance and kiss. She leaves however, when Walt states his belief that his former colleague and friend Tommy must have hired her.

Walt tells Rusty that a former colleague of him and Tommy abused his friendship by hitching a ride to the airport, after having stolen a fortune from their employer. Rusty responds with his own confession: He had taken Mr. Z's money after the police had vacated the building to pay for her surgery, meaning the singing lessons had been a front. Feeling used again, Walt leaves in anger. Building superintendent Leo, who had been threatened by Mr. Z., opens Rusty's medical bill, realizing he has the money. Walt goes back to the nightclub for the first time since his stroke and makes up with Tia. When he returns Leo tells him to ignore any sounds he might hear that night. The three criminals ambush Rusty in his apartment, and Walt goes upstairs again. Together Rusty and Walt manage to kill them. The wounded Walt is loaded into an ambulance, after which Rusty hands the paramedics the cash to get him the best care available. They renew their friendship and singing lessons.

Cast
 Robert De Niro as Walter Koontz
 Philip Seymour Hoffman as Rusty
 Skipp Sudduth as Tommy
 Barry Miller as Leonard Wilcox
 Chris Bauer as Jacko
 Wilson Jermaine Heredia as Cha-Cha
 Nashom Wooden as Amazing Grace credited as Nashom Benjamin
 Daphne Rubin-Vega as Tia
 Rory Cochrane as Pogo
 Scott Allen Cooper as Ivana
 Jude Ciccolella as Detective Noonan
 Mina Bern as Mrs. Spivak
 Penny Balfour as Cristal
 Victor Rasuk (uncredited) as Neighborhood boy
 Richie Lamontagne  as Carmine the Pizza Boy
 Luis Saguar as Mr. Z
 Mitchell Lichtenstein as Gay Republican Spokesperson
 John Enos as Sonny, Rusty's abusive boyfriend
 Karina Arroyave as Amber
 Wanda De Jesus as Karen
 Madhur Jaffrey as dr. Nirmala
 John R. Corcoran as physical therapist LaShaun

Soundtrack
 "Planet Love" – Taylor Dayne  (Allee Willis; Bruce Roberts)
 "Half-Breed" – Cher (Al Capps; Mary Dean)
 "Lady Marmalade" (Live) – Patti LaBelle (Bob Crewe; Kenny Nolan)
 "When the Money's Gone" – Bruce Roberts (Bruce Roberts; Donna Weiss)
 "G.A.Y." – Geri Halliwell (Geri Halliwell; Watkins; Wilson)
 "When Will You Learn" – Boy George (G. O'Dowd; John Themis; Mike Koglin)
 "La Chica Marita" – Marcus Schenkenberg (J. Beauvoir; T. Catania)
 "Turn Me Over" – Wonderbox (Monica Murphy)
 "Lady Marmalade" – All Saints (Bob Crewe; Kenny Nolan)
 "Sidewalk Talk" – John "Jellybean" Benitez (Madonna)
 "Can't Stop Love" – Soul Solution (Bobby Guy; Ernie Lake)
 "Give It to Me" – Drama Kidz (Danny Sullivan; E. Holterhoff; Jellybean)
 "The Name Game" – Shirley Ellis (Lincoln Chase; Shirley Ellis)
 "Whenever You Fall" – Taylor Dayne (Taylor Dayne; B.G. Craziose; Ernie Lake; Janice Robinson)
 "The Neighborhood" – Bruce Roberts; Gohl; Sarah McLachlan (Bruce Roberts)
 "Tia's Tango" – Bruce Roberts; Gohl; Sarah McLachlan (Bruce Roberts)
 "Luciano" – Bruce Roberts; Gohl; Sarah McLachlan (Bruce Roberts)

Production

Casting
Hoffman considered De Niro to be the most imposing actor that he had ever worked with, noting how De Niro had the ability during the shooting to "listen" to him as an actor, and in turn, make Hoffman respond similarly because of his unique style of acting. Hoffman felt that his exposure to that level of acting profoundly improved his own abilities as an actor.

Reception
Review-aggregate site Rotten Tomatoes reports a 41% approval rating based on 56 reviews, with an average rating of 5.3/10, and a consensus reading: "Robert De Niro and Philip Seymour Hoffman's Flawless performances live up to this dramedy's title; unfortunately, they're outweighed by the misguided picture surrounding them." Audiences surveyed by CinemaScore gave the film a grade of "C" on scale of A+ to F.

Hoffman was praised by critics for his ability to avoid clichés in playing such a delicate role. Emily VanDerWerff, a transgender film critic, praised the warmth of his portrayal of Rusty, commenting that "Hoffman’s work is quiet, moving, and humanistic, and it provides the film with a core Schumacher doesn’t remotely earn. No matter; this is another movie worth seeing almost entirely for the titanic work Hoffman does near its center."  Roger Ebert highlighted Hoffman as "one of the best new character actors", remarking that he was "able to take a flamboyant role and find the quiet details in it".

Hoffman received a Screen Actors Guild Award nomination for Best Lead Actor.

References

External links

 
 
 

1999 films
1990s buddy comedy-drama films
1990s crime comedy-drama films
1999 LGBT-related films
American buddy comedy-drama films
American crime comedy-drama films
American LGBT-related films
1990s English-language films
Films directed by Joel Schumacher
Films with screenplays by Joel Schumacher
Films set in New York City
LGBT-related comedy-drama films
Metro-Goldwyn-Mayer films
Films about trans women
Transgender-related films
Drag (clothing)-related films
1990s American films
Films about anti-LGBT sentiment
Films about disability